The South Pole Medal or Medal Commemorating the 1910–1911 Fram Expedition to the South Pole (Medalje til erindring om "Frams" ekspedisjon til Sydpolen 1910–1911) is a Norwegian medal established by Haakon VII of Norway on August 20, 1912 to recognize participants in Roald Amundsen's South Pole expedition. The medal was awarded to participants in the exhibition on the day it was instituted. The medal was designed by the engraver Ivar Throndsen.

Description
The South Pole Medal was cast in gold, silver, and bronze, and it was awarded in gold. The obverse depicts King Haakon VII with his name and motto. The obverse is identical to that of the King's Medal of Merit. The reverse depicts the southern hemisphere and the Southern Cross together with a field for the name of the medal recipient and the year 1911. The lower part is framed by crossed oak and laurel branches. The medal is topped by a royal crown. The medal ribbon is dark blue with a red stripe edged in white in the middle.

The medal was accompanied by a certificate whose design was exactly the same as that awarded together with the King's Medal of Merit.

Recipients
The South Pole Medal was awarded to the following people:

Roald Amundsen
Andreas Beck
Olav Bjaaland
Hjalmar Fredrik Gjertsen
Ludvig A. Hansen
Helmer J. Hanssen
Sverre Hassel
Hjalmar Johansen
Halvardus Kristensen
Alexander Kutschin
Adolf Lindstrøm
Thorvald Nilsen
Jacob Nødtvedt
Karenius B. Olsen
Kristian Prestrud 
Martin Rønne
Jørgen Stubberud
Knut Sundbeck
Oscar Wisting

References

Orders, decorations, and medals of Norway
Awards established in 1912
Amundsen's South Pole expedition